Two Wings is a Scottish rock band formed in 2009 in Glasgow, Scotland.

The band was created when founder member of Nalle, Hanna Tuulikki, and former Trembling Bells guitarist, Ben Reynolds, began a songwriting collaboration. Their debut album, Love's Spring, was released in 2012 on Tin Angel Records. The band played a short UK tour with label mate Doug Tielli, followed by a longer run of dates with Canadian guitarist Eric Chenaux. They released their latest album A Wake in 2014.

Current members
Hanna Tuulikki
Ben Reynolds
Lucy Duncombe
Kenny Wilson
Owen Curtis Williams

Releases
Love's Spring (2012)
A Wake (2014)

References

Scottish rock music groups